

Appointed governors
Takatoshi Iwamura 1883-1890
Shiba Sankarasu 1898-1900
Kiichirō Kumagai 1914-1915
Ōta Masahiro 1915-1916
Jiro Yamagata 1922-1923
Korekiyo Otsuka 1927
Sukenari Yokoyama 1927
Nakano Kunikazu 1929-1931
Masasuke Kodama 1937-1938
Shunsuke Kondo 1938-1939
Narita Ichiro 1939-1940

Elected governors
Wakio Shibano 1947-1955
Jujitsu Taya 1955-1963
Yōichi Nakanishi 1963-1994
Masanori Tanimoto 1994–2022
Hiroshi Hase 2022-present

 
Ishikawa Prefecture